Pachal waterfall, with fall height of , is claimed to be the tallest waterfall of Nepal. The height was measured based on a GPS survey. It is located in Pachaljharna Gaupalika of Kalikot District. 

The site has been declared as a centre of tourism development by the Karnali Provincial government. The village municipality is named after this waterfall.

See also
List of waterfalls of Nepal

References

Waterfalls of Nepal
Geography of Karnali Province